Kawa Garbo or Khawa Karpo (also transcribed as Kawadgarbo, Khawakarpo, Moirig Kawagarbo, Kawa Karpo or Kha-Kar-Po), as it is known by local residents and pilgrims, or Kawagebo Peak, is the highest mountain in the Chinese province of Yunnan. It is located on the border between Dêqên County, Yunnan, and the counties of Zogang and Zayü of the Tibet Autonomous Region. What is now Dêqên County has been part of Yunnan since the 1720s, when the current border with Tibet was established by the early Qing Dynasty. Kawagarbo is one of the most sacred peaks in the Tibetan world  and is often referred to as Nyainqênkawagarbo to show its sacredness and avoid ambiguousness with the other Kawagarbo in the Anung-Derung-speaking Gongshan County.

Geography
Kawagarbo is the high point in a range of high peaks that are generally referred to by Tibetans also as Kawagarpo. A mapping error by the Chinese army during the 1950s transcribed the name for a lower range of mountains to the north on a much larger area that also included Kawagarbo. The name of this lower range in Tibetan is Menri (Wylie system; Sman-ri in the Wade–Giles system; name means Mountains of Medicinal Herbs), but is most widely known by its Chinese transliteration, Meili Xue Shan (梅里雪山 or Meili Snow Mountain). This is the name most widely applied to the range by Chinese and Western sources. The Meili range is a small massif of the much more extensive Hengduan Shan, the major north-south trending complex of mountains lying along the eastern edge of the Tibetan Plateau in eastern Tibet, northwestern Yunnan, western Sichuan, and far northern Myanmar. The Meili Xue Shan forms part of the divide between the Salween (Nujiang) and Mekong (Lancangjiang) rivers.

Topographic extremes are immense, with vertical relief ranging from less than 2,000 m along the Mekong River on the east to 6,740 m on the summit of Kawagarpo within 10 km horizontal distance. Even greater topographic relief is found on the west or Salween River side of the range. Coincident with this extreme topographic gradient is a similarly steep environmental gradient. Compressed within this short distance are subtropical scrub ecosystems along the arid canyon bottoms, rising through dry oak forests, humid mixed deciduous-coniferous forests, cold temperate coniferous forests, alpine meadows and scree above treeline, to permanent snow on the high peaks. The Mingyong Glacier, descending from the summit of Kawagarbo, terminates at a low elevation just before the subtropical life zone. The range is highly affected by the monsoon, leading to especially unstable snow conditions, which have affected climbing attempts (see below).

Sacred mountain worship
Kawagarbo is one of the most sacred mountains for Tibetan Buddhism as the spiritual home of a warrior god of the same name. It is visited by 20,000 pilgrims each year from throughout the Tibetan world; many pilgrims circumambulate the peak, an arduous  trek Although it is important throughout Tibetan Buddhism, it is the local Tibetans that are the day-to-day guardians and stewards of Kawagarbo, both the deity and the mountain.

The ancestral religion of the Kawagarpo area, as in much of Tibet, was Bön, a shamanistic tradition based on the concept of a world pervaded by good and evil spirits. Bön encompassed numerous deities and spirits which are still recognized today, and are often connected with specific geographical localities and natural features; the major mountain peaks in the Hengduan Mountains are thus all identified with specific deities. Kawagarbo is one of these. Since its introduction, Tibetan Buddhism has been the dominant religion of the Kawagarbo area, with followers of Gelugpa doctrine being the most common.

Tibetans believe the warrior god will leave them if human sets foot on the peak of Kawakarpo, making the ground unholy. Disasters will follow as they lose god's protection. Tibetans have also established a centuries-old sacred geography around the peak, maintained by religious leaders from local monasteries in negotiation with local villages. This sacred natural site preserves the natural resources and ecological health of the range.

Climbing history
The first attempt on Kawakarpo was made in 1987 by a party from the Joetsu Alpine Club of Japan.

In the winter of 1990–91 a group from the Academic Alpine Club of Kyoto University attempted the peak in conjunction with a Chinese group. Their activity caused heavy protests from the local Tibetan community due to the mountain's cultural and religious significance. On 3 January 1991, a nighttime avalanche killed all seventeen members of the expedition, in one of the most deadly mountaineering accidents in history. The Kyoto club returned in 1996 to make another unsuccessful attempt.

American expeditions, led by Nicholas Clinch, visited the range in 1988, 1989, 1992, and 1993, attempting other major peaks, but were unsuccessful.

In 2001, local government passed laws banning all future climbing attempts on cultural and religious grounds. , none of the significant peaks of the range have been successfully climbed.

Retreat of Mingyong Glacier

Mingyong Glacier descends steeply from the east face of Kawagarbo into the Mekong River valley on the Yunnan side of the massif. Because it descends from near the summit of Kawagarbo, it is also considered sacred by Tibetan Buddhists and two temples are located along its lower edge. From those temples, the rapid retreat of Mingyong Glacier is obvious, especially to local people who observe it year in and year out. A monk from Taizi Temple reflected on this rapid retreat of Mingyong Glacier, concerned that it might be punishment from Kawagarpo for the lack of devotion by him and his fellow Buddhists.

The retreat of Mingyong Glacier, linked to a warming climate in the Deqin area, has received considerable attention for its implications for biodiversity conservation, retrieval of climber's bodies killed in the 1991 avalanche, impacts on Mingyong village water supply, and in the broader context of climate change impacts to biological and social systems in northwest Yunnan and beyond.

See also
 Three Parallel Rivers of Yunnan Protected Areas, a UNESCO World Heritage Site, includes Kawagarbo/Meili, we well as a number of other iconic mountain landscapes in northwestern Yunnan.

References

Highest points of Chinese provinces
Mountains of Yunnan
Mountains of Tibet
Tibetan Buddhist places
Tourist attractions in Yunnan
Six-thousanders of the Transhimalayas
Geography of Dêqên Tibetan Autonomous Prefecture